The Writers' Trust of Canada is a registered charity which provides financial support to Canadian writers.

Founded by Margaret Atwood, Pierre Berton, Graeme Gibson, Margaret Laurence, and David Young, the Writers' Trust celebrates and rewards the talents and achievements of Canada's novelists, short story writers, poets, biographers, and other fiction and nonfiction writers. It was registered as a charitable organization on March 3, 1976.

The organization funds and administers a number of Canadian literary awards including the Atwood Gibson Writers' Trust Fiction Prize and the Hilary Weston Writers' Trust Prize for Nonfiction.

The organization funds programs and events to help emerging Canadian writers including the annual Margaret Laurence Lecture, given by a noted Canadian writer; writers' residencies at Berton House in Dawson City, Yukon; and the Woodcock Fund, which provides emergency financial assistance to Canadian writers, named in memory of the Canadian poet George Woodcock. Annual fundraisers include the Writers' Trust Gala in Toronto and Politics and the Pen in Ottawa. Money raised to finance the charitable activities of the Writers' Trust is drawn almost exclusively from the private sector.

Management
The Writers' Trust of Canada is run by a board of directors composed of volunteers from the arts and business communities, and counseled by an Authors' Advisory Group composed of writers from across the country. Staff members see to the day-to-day operations out of a downtown Toronto office shared with the Writers' Union of Canada.

Juries are composed of writers based on recommendations by the Authors' Advisory Group; invitations are issued by the staff.

Awards
Prize winners are announced at the annual Writers' Trust Awards with the following exceptions:
The Shaughnessy Cohen Prize for Political Writing is handed out at Politics and the Pen in Ottawa.
The RBC Bronwen Wallace Award for Emerging Writers winner is announced separately in the spring.
The Dayne Ogilvie Prize is presented during Toronto's Pride Week.

All awards are open to citizens and permanent residents of Canada. Winners are decided by an independent jury, usually consisting of three prominent writers.

Shaughnessy Cohen Prize for Political Writing 
The Shaughnessy Cohen Prize for Political Writing was established in honour of Shaughnessy Cohen (1948–1998), an outspoken and popular Member of Parliament from Windsor, Ontario; she died after suffering a cerebral hemorrhage in the House of Commons of Canada just seconds after standing to address her peers.

The winning work combines compelling new insights with depth of research and significant literary merit. All finalist works will demonstrate a distinctive voice, as well as a persuasive and compelling command of tone, narrative, style, and analysis. The prize particularly values books which provide the general reader with an informed, unique perspective on the practice of Canadian politics, its players, or its principles. The jurors shortlist between three and five titles. Prizes of  will be awarded to each of the finalists.

Past winners include Jane Jacobs for Dark Age Ahead and James Orbinski for An Imperfect Offering: Humanitarian Action in the Twenty-first Century.

RBC Bronwen Wallace Award for Emerging Writers 
The RBC Bronwen Wallace Award for Emerging Writers was established by author Carolyn Smart and honours the memory of Bronwen Wallace (1945 - 1989), a Canadian poet and short story writer who died of cancer at the age of 44.

Two  awards are given each year to emerging writers of any age in the genres of short fiction and poetry. Two finalists in each category receive . Past winners include Michael Crummey and Alison Pick.

The Royal Bank of Canada Foundation sponsors the award as part of their RBC Emerging Artists Project, which works to support talented young adults in their development of professional careers in the arts. In 2008, the prize presentation was moved from the fall to the spring, creating the absence of 2007's award. In 2020, the age limit was removed, opening the award up to Canadian emerging writers of any age.

Hilary Weston Writers' Trust Prize for Nonfiction 
The prize is awarded for literary excellence in the category of nonfiction, which includes, among other forms: personal or journalistic essays, memoirs, commentary, both social and political criticism, history, and biography. Finalist works demonstrate, in the opinion of the jury, a distinctive voice, as well as a persuasive and compelling command of tone, narrative, style, and technique. The jury is free to interpret the definition of literary nonfiction as they see fit and finalist works are not required to encapsulate every aspect of the definition.

First established in 1997, the award's original corporate sponsor was Viacom. Pearson Canada, an educational book publishing company, took over the award in 1999, and Nereus Financial, a stock brokerage firm, became the sponsor from 2006 to 2008. From 2008 until 2011, the award had no corporate sponsor. In 2011, philanthropist and former Lieutenant Governor of Ontario, Hon. Hilary M. Weston, was announced as the award's new sponsor.

Atwood Gibson Writers' Trust Fiction Prize 
The Atwood Gibson Writers' Trust Fiction Prize, worth , is awarded to the novel or short story collection that, in the opinion of the judges, is the year's best book of fiction. The winner, selected by a three-member, independent judging panel, is announced at the annual Writers' Trust Awards.

Formerly known as the Rogers Writers' Trust Fiction Prize, the award was renamed in January 2021 in honour of writer Margaret Atwood and her late husband Graeme Gibson. Rogers Communications sponsored the award from 1997-2019, when it was a  prize. Past prize winners include Alice Munro (2004), Lawrence Hill (2007), and David Chariandy (2017).

Writers' Trust Engel Findley Award 
The Writers' Trust Engel Findley Award is given to a writer in mid-career for a body of work, and in anticipation of future contribution to Canadian literature. It was created in 2008 from two separate awards formerly known as the Marian Engel Award for female writers and the Timothy Findley Award for male writers. Marian Engel (1933–1985) was an award-winning Canadian novelist and passionate activist for the national and international writer's cause; Timothy Findley (1930–2002) was an influential Canadian novelist and playwright.

All Canadian and permanent resident writers in mid-career are considered and no age restrictions apply. For the purposes of this award, mid-career is defined as having published, in Canada, at least 3 books of literary merit which are predominantly fiction. The prize is worth ; the winner is selected by a three-member, independent judging panel and announced annually at the Writers' Trust Awards. There is no submission process. Past winners include Miriam Toews and Nino Ricci.

Matt Cohen Award: In Celebration of a Writing Life 

Matt Cohen (1942–1999), winner of the Governor General's Literary Award for Fiction in 1999, was a celebrated and prolific writer who died from lung cancer at the age of 56. The Matt Cohen Award: In Celebration of a Writing Life was established by a group of anonymous donors in his memory.

This  prize is presented annually to a Canadian or permanent resident whose life has been dedicated to writing, in honour of distinguished work in poetry or prose in either English or French. All Canadians and permanent residents dedicated to writing as a primary pursuit are considered. An independent jury selects the winner, and there is no submission process; the winner of the prize is announced at the annual Writers' Trust Awards. Past winners include Jean Little and Mavis Gallant.

Vicky Metcalf Award for Literature for Young People 
Vicky Metcalf, a noted children's author and wife of George Cedric Metcalf, created this award in 1963 to stimulate the writing of literature for young Canadians. She held a passion for storytelling and published several children's books.

The Vicky Metcalf Award for Literature for Young People is worth  and is limited to works written by Canadian citizens or permanent residents. In contrast to other Writers' Trust literary prizes, qualifying authors published with a non-Canadian publisher are not excluded. An independent jury selects the winner and there is no submission process. The prize is announced annually at the Writers' Trust Awards. Past winners include Robert Munsch and Kenneth Oppel.

The award was known as the Vicky Metcalf Award for Children's Literature until a name change in 2013. It has been administered by the Writers' Trust since 2002 and was previously awarded by the Metcalf Foundation, which strives "to enhance the effectiveness of people and organizations working together to help Canadians imagine and build a just, healthy and creative society". The Metcalf Foundation continues to sponsor the annual award.

Writers' Trust McClelland and Stewart Journey Prize 
The Writers' Trust McClelland & Stewart Journey Prize is made possible by James A. Michener's donation of his Canadian royalty earnings from his novel Journey, published by McClelland & Stewart in 1988.

The Journey Prize is a  award given annually to a new and developing writer of distinction for a short story published in a Canadian literary publication; there is no age restriction. The journal that published the winning entry also receives . A three-member, independent jury announces the winner at the annual Writers' Trust Awards. The longlist, chosen by the jury, is compiled each year to form the Journey Prize Stories anthology. Past winners include Timothy Taylor, Yann Martel, and Yasuko Thanh.

Dayne Ogilvie Prize for LGBTQ Emerging Writers 
Originally established as a grant in 2007, the Dayne Ogilvie Prize was founded in memory of Dayne Ogilvie by close personal friend, Robin Pacific. Ogilvie was a highly respected freelance book editor, writer, and manager. A passionate lover of all the arts, he died in October 2006.

The  prize has been presented to a Canadian writer who is part of the LGBTQ community and demonstrates great promise through a body of work of exceptional quality. It is the only prize of its kind in Canada serving the LGBTQ community; any self-identifying writer is eligible. While no age restriction exists, the prize is intended for those who are still developing their writing career. To qualify, writers must have published at least one book of fiction. The winner is selected by a three-member, independent jury and announced annually during Toronto's Pride Week; there is no submission process. Past winners include Nancy Jo Cullen and Farzana Doctor.

Latner Writers' Trust Poetry Prize
Created in 2014 in conjunction with the Latner Family Foundation, the Latner Writers' Trust Poetry Prize presents $25,000 to a Canadian poet who has published at least three collections of poetry, to honour their body of work.

Balsillie Prize for Public Policy
Endowed by former Research in Motion CEO Jim Balsillie, the  Balsillie Prize for Public Policy honours Canadian writing on public policy matters, and was presented for the first time in 2021.

Defunct awards

Drainie-Taylor Biography Prize
Beginning in 1999, the organization presented the Drainie-Taylor Biography Prize to a book judged as the year's best work of biography, autobiography or memoir. Endowed by actor and writer Claire Drainie Taylor, the award was discontinued in 2006 after a reorganization of the awards program.

Gordon Montador Award
The Gordon Montador Award was presented for nonfiction work from 1993 to 1999, when it was superseded by a reorganization of the nonfiction awards.

Programs

Woodcock Fund 
Established in 1989 by George Woodcock and his wife Ingeborg, the Woodcock Fund provides emergency funding to professional Canadian writers mid-project who are facing an unforeseen financial need that threatens the completion of their book, and who lack the resources to meet that situation. Each financial grant is given as one time assistance for a specific emergency.  (The program does not consider requests for chronic situations or project funding; nor can it consider situations resulting from general indebtedness or unemployment.) All applications to the Fund are processed in confidence. Successful applicants are urged to acknowledge their grants in their books.

From 1989-2020, the Woodcock Fund have  to 250 writers.

Berton House Writers' Retreat 
 The Berton House Writers' Retreat provides a unique opportunity for 4 professional Canadian creative writers each year to work in a remote northern community for 3 months each. The writer is housed in a two-bedroom bungalow in Dawson City, Yukon, the boyhood home of author Pierre Berton. Additionally, a  honorarium is provided to allow the author to focus in the remote setting. Over 80 authors have been invited to participate in the program since its inception in 1996, including Pasha Malla, Charlotte Gray, and Chris Turner. In the fall of 2006, HGTV's Designer Guys gave the bungalow an update on their popular interior design show.

Margaret Laurence Lecture 

The Margaret Laurence Lecture series was created in honour of Margaret Laurence (1926–1987), a celebrated novelist and short story writer. The annual lecture series has invited some of Canada's most prominent authors to discuss the theme of "A Writer's Life" in front of their peers since 1987. Notable names such as Dionne Brand, Tomson Highway, Olive Senior, Hugh MacLennan, Mavis Gallant, Timothy Findley, W. O. Mitchell, Pierre Berton, P. K. Page, Dorothy Livesay, Alistair MacLeod, and Margaret Atwood, among others, have shared the personal challenges they faced in forging their own paths as writers. Approximately 45 minutes in length, the lectures are meant to provide a unique account of a period when a national writing community was just being formed. The series offers insight into the work of Canadian literature's heroes and heroines, the profession of writing as a whole, and Canada's unique cultural history. The Writers' Trust provides a  honorarium to each speaker; an anthology of the lecture series was published in May 2011 by McClelland & Stewart to coincide with the 25th anniversary lecture.

Writers' Trust Mentorship 
The Writers’ Trust Mentorship program provides guidance through one-on-one instruction to a developing writer from an established writer. Three mentors are selected by the Writers’ Trust, each working in one of the fields of fiction, poetry, and literary nonfiction. Mentor select one mentee from a pool of applicants to work with over a 5-month period. Mentees receive .

Rising Stars 
The Writers’ Trust Rising Stars program is a career development program. Authors in the early stages of their careers receive $5,000 and an endorsement from an influential Canadian author. Five notable Canadian writers each select one developing writer with potential. Through a mentorship component, selectors offer recipients feedback and advice. Rising Stars attend a series of professional and networking events and are invited to attend a two-week self-directed writing residency at the Banff Centre for Arts and Creativity.

Fellowship 
The WT Fellowship rewards one writer $50,000 for demonstrating exceptional creative ability and outstanding promise in their publications to date. The Fellowship is meant to provide recipients a window in which they can work on their next book with as much creative freedom as possible. Fellows are invited to attend a two-week, self-directed residency at the Leighton Artists’ Colony at The Banff Centre in Alberta. Writers who have a strong publishing track record in the categories of fiction, literary nonfiction, poetry, or literature for young people are eligible.

Events and fundraisers

Politics and the Pen 
The Politics and the Pen gala is a celebration of Canadian political and literary cultures. Held in Ottawa at the Fairmont Château Laurier, the event brings together national politicians, writers, diplomats, and leaders of the arts and business communities for an evening of food, fundraising, and entertainment. The climax of the evening is the presentation of the  Shaughnessy Cohen Prize for Political Writing, sponsored by CN. The event is popular among politicians and their friends; waiting lists for table sponsorships and individual tickets are common.

The 2018 event was co-hosted by Jagmeet Singh and Bardish Chagger.

Writers' Trust Gala 
The annual Writers' Trust Gala brings leaders of the business and arts communities together to celebrate writing and raise funds for the Writers' Trust of Canada. Corporate donors and individual patrons are seated at a table with a published Canadian author and enjoy an evening of conversation and literary entertainment. Hundreds of thousands of dollars are raised on this night alone, when more than fifty of Canada's top writers mingle with curious guests. Canadian publishers donate each attending author's recent book, ensuring that everyone goes home with a signed copy.

Writers' Trust Awards 

One of Canada's premiere literary events, the Writers' Trust Awards is a celebration of each year's best books and the achievements of Canada's supreme literary talents.

The following prizes are awarded at the annual Writers' Trust Awards: 
Atwood Gibson Writers' Trust Fiction Prize
Hilary Weston Writers' Trust Prize for Nonfiction
Writers' Trust of Canada McClelland & Stewart Journey Prize
Writers' Trust Engel Findley Award
Vicky Metcalf Award for Literature for Young People
Matt Cohen Award: In Celebration of a Writing Life
Latner Writers' Trust Poetry Prize

Literary salons 
The Writers' Trust works with individuals to organize private fundraisers called literary salons. Events include dinner parties, evening cocktail parties, weekend brunches, wine tasting experiences, and children's tea parties, to raise funds for the organization. The Writers' Trust helps each host secure an ideal literary guest; past participating authors include Lawrence Hill, Adrienne Clarkson, Margaret MacMillan, and Robert Rotenberg. A literary salon helps to promote the work of a Canadian writer, and all proceeds support the charitable work of the Writers' Trust of Canada.

References

External links
Writers' Trust of Canada

Canadian writers' organizations

Arts organizations established in 1976
1976 establishments in Ontario